Água Azul do Norte is a municipality in the state of Pará in the Northern region of Brazil.

The municipality contains a small part of the Carajás National Forest, a  sustainable use conservation unit created in 1998 that includes mining operations in a huge deposit of high-grade iron ore.

See also
List of municipalities in Pará

References

Municipalities in Pará